Mehrauli is a neighbourhood in South Delhi, a district of Delhi in India. It represents a constituency in the legislative assembly of Delhi. The area is close to Gurgaon and next to Vasant Kunj.

History

Mehrauli is one of the seven medieval cities that make up the present state of Delhi.  

The Lal Kot fort was constructed by the Tomar chief Anangpal I around 731AD and expanded by AnangPal II in the 11thcentury, who shifted his capital to Lal Kot from Kannauj.The Tomars were defeated by the Chauhans in the 12th century. Prithviraj Chauhan further expanded the fort and called it Qila Rai Pithora. He was defeated and killed in 1192 by Mohammed Ghori, who put his general Qutb-ud-din Aybak in charge and returned to Afghanistan. Subsequently in 1206, after the death of Mohammed Ghori, Qutubuddin enthroned himself as the first Sultan of Delhi. Thus Delhi became the capital of the Mamluk dynasty of Delhi (Slave dynasty), the first dynasty of Muslim sultans to rule over northern India. Mehrauli remained the capital of the Mamluk dynasty which ruled until 1290. During the Khilji dynasty, the capital shifted to Siri.

In 12th-century Jain scriptures, the location is also mentioned as Yogninipura, now noticeable by the presence of the "Yogmaya Temple", near the Qutub Minar complex, believed to have been built by the Pandavas.

It was also the execution place of Baba Banda Singh Bahadur ji due to religious persecution.

Geography and climate
To its north lies Malviya Nagar. Vasant Kunj lies to its West and Tughlakabad to its south.

Like the rest of Delhi, Mehrauli has a semi-arid climate with high variation between summer and winter temperatures. While the summer temperatures may go up to 46 °C, the winters can seem freezing to people used to a warm climate with near 0 °C.

The soil of Mehrauli consists of sandy loam to loam texture. The water level has gone down in the recent past hovering between 45 m to 50 m due to rise in population.

Architecture

Though Mehrauli is like any ordinary neighborhood today, its past is what distinguishes it in terms of architecture.

Ahinsa Sthal is a Jain temple located in Mehrauli, Delhi. The main deity of the temple is Mahavira, the 24th and last Tirthankara (human spiritual guide) of a present half cycle of time. A magnificent statue of Tirthankara Mahāvīra is installed here.

Even though the capital shifted from Mehrauli after the Slave dynasty rule came to an end, many other dynasties contributed significantly to Mehrauli's architecture.

The most visible piece of architecture remains the Qutub Minar which was built by Qutb al-Din Aibak with subsequent additions by Iltutmish and Alauddin Khalji. The Qutb Minar complex is a UNESCO World Heritage Site, and also the venue for the annual Qutub Festival.Mausoleum of a 13th-century Sufi saint, Khwaja Qutbuddin Bakhtiar Kaki, is also situated near the Qutub Minar Complex and the venue for the annual Phoolwalon-ki-sair Festival. The dargah complex also houses graves of later Mughal emperors, Bahadur Shah I, Shah Alam II, and Akbar II, in an adjacent marble enclosure. To the left of the dargah, lies Zafar Mahal, the summer palace of the last Mughal Emperor Bahadur Shah Zafar along with Moti Masjid, a small mosque, built for private prayer by the son of Aurangeb, Bahadur Shah I.

Balban's tomb belonging to Balban, Slave dynasty ruler of Delhi Sultanate was constructed here in the 13th century can still be seen through in a dilapidated condition. The architecturally important structure as it is the first true arch in Indo-Islamic architecture. Another tomb, that of Balban's son, Khan Shahid, who died before he could be crowned, is also located nearby in Mehrauli Archeological Park.

A baoli or stepwell known as Rajon Ki Baoli was constructed in 1506 during Sikandar Lodhi's reign. It was used to store water though it is now completely dried and is now known as Sukhi Baoli (dry well).

The Jamali Kamali mosque was built in 1528, in honour of the Sufi saint Shaikh Hamid bin Fazlullah, also known as Dervish Shaikh Jamali Kamboh Dihlawi or Jalal Khan. The saint's tomb built-in 1536 upon his death is adjacent to the mosque.

Near Jamali Kamali lies the tomb of Quli Khan, which during the British period was converted into a country house by the Metcalfe family. Known as ‘the retreat’ or ‘Dilkhusha’, this was built by Sir Thomas Theophilus Metcalfe in true English style as a pleasure retreat by surrounding it with many rest houses, follies, and gardens. 'Dilkhusha' in the Urdu language means "Delight of the Heart".

The Adham Khan's Tomb was constructed by Emperor Akbar in memory of his foster brother and general Adham Khan in 1566. The tomb, also known as Bhulbhulaiyan, as one could get lost in the labyrinth of its passages, it was later used by the British as a residence, rest house and even as a police station. Close to Adham Khan's tomb, lies that of another Mughal General, Muhammad Quli Khan, later it served as the residence of Sir Thomas Metcalfe, governor-general's agent at the Mughal court. The Mehrauli Archaeological Park spread over 200 acres, adjacent to Qutb Minar site was redeveloped in 1997.

Politics
In the 2013 Delhi Legislative Assembly election, Parvesh Verma of BJP was elected as the MLA of Mehrauli. He succeeded Yoganand Shastri, former Delhi Assembly Speaker affiliated to the Indian National Congress

Mehrauli Assembly Constituency comprises four municipal wards, namely, ward 169 Lado Sarai (W), ward 170 Mehrauli (GEN), ward 171 Vasant Kunj (SCW) and wards 172 Kishangarh (W). All four wards are represented by women councilors in the Municipal Corporation.

Schools 

 St. John's School
 St.Maria School
 Baba Banda Singh Bahadur Memorial School
 Lareesa Public School
 I.G. Delhi Public School
 Saraswati Bal Vidya Mandir
 Ramanujan Sarvodaya Kanya Vidyalaya
 Government Boys' Senior Secondary School-2
 Government Boys' Senior Secondary School-3
 Suryathan Play School
 Prince Public School

2008 blasts

Concealed in a black polythene bag, a bomb was dropped by two unidentified persons riding a motorcycle In Sarai Electronic Market in New Delhi on 27 September 2008. A fortnight after three of the capital's top markets were targeted by terrorists, a medium-intensity blast ripped through the congested flower market in South Delhi's Mehrauli area killing at least two and injuring 22 others.

Accessibility

 Indira Gandhi International Airport is approximately 17 km.
 18 km approximately from New Delhi Railway Stations
 Nearest metro station is Qutab Minar Metro Station.
 Adam Khan Tomb - Also known as Bhool Bhulaiya is situated next to Aggarwal Sweets and near Bus Stand.
 Gandhak ki Baoli - It is an ancient step well located near Mehrauli Post Office.
 Rajon Ki Baoli - 16th century stepwell near Gandhak ki Baoli
 Yogmaya Temple - Around 1 km from Qutub Minar and about 100 meters prior to Bus Stand.
 Village Roads - Village roads in Mehrauli are known in the neighborhood as narrow poorly maintained roads. Non-licensed street vendors/hawkers are very common sites on these roads.
 Zafar_Mahal_(Mehrauli) is situated adjacent to the shrine of Hazrat Qutubuddin Bakhtiyar Qaki R.A.
 Dadabari Jain Mandir is situated on Sri Dev Puri Ashram marg, Opposite Qutub Minar Metro station.
 Madhi Masjid - A Remnant Of The Lodhi Era, Madhi Masjid is a 15th Century fortified mosque.

Areas in South Delhi 

 Greater Kailash
 Chanakyapuri
 Lajpat Nagar
 Mehrauli
 Nehru Place
 Safdarjung New Delhi
 South Extension
 Kishangarh Village
 Vasant Kunj
 Shahpur Jat
 Khanpur
 Sanjay Van

Historical architecture in Mehrauli

See also 
 Neighbourhoods of Delhi

References

Further reading

 All About Delhi Delhi, the Capital of India, by Anon. Asian Educational Services, 1997. .

External links
Collection of Photographs Capturing Mehrauli's Diversity

 
Neighbourhoods in Delhi
Mamluk dynasty (Delhi)
South West Delhi district
District subdivisions of Delhi